Eremias multiocellata, the multi-ocellated racerunner, is a species of lizard found in Mongolia, China, Kazakhstan, Kyrgyzstan, and Russia.

References

multiocellata
Reptiles described in 1872
Taxa named by Albert Günther
Reptiles of Russia